The 2014–15 Texas A&M Aggies women's basketball team will represent Texas A&M University in the 2014–15 college basketball season. The team's head coach is Gary Blair, who was in his twelfth season at Texas A&M. The team plays their home games at the Reed Arena in College Station, Texas and will play in its third season as a member of the Southeastern Conference. They finished the season 23–10, 10–6 in SEC play to finish in a three-way tie for fourth place. They lost in the quarterfinals of the SEC women's tournament to LSU. They received an automatic to the NCAA women's tournament where they lost to Arkansas–Little Rock in the first round.

Roster

Schedule and Results

|-
!colspan=12 style="background:#500000; color:#FFFFFF;"| Exhibition

|-
!colspan=12 style="background:#500000; color:#FFFFFF;"| Non-Conference Games

|-
!colspan=12 style="background:#500000; color:#FFFFFF;"| Conference Games

|-
!colspan=12 style="background:#500000;"| 2015 SEC Tournament

|-
!colspan=12 style="background:#500000;"| NCAA Women's Tournament

See also
 2014–15 NCAA Division I women's basketball season	
 2014–15 NCAA Division I women's basketball rankings
 2014–15 Texas A&M Aggies men's basketball team

Rankings

References

Texas A&M Aggies women's basketball seasons
Texas AandM
Texas AandM Aggies women's basketball
Texas AandM Aggies women's basketball
Texas